Levedi, or Lebed, Levedias, Lebedias, and Lebedi was a Hungarian chieftain, the first known chieftain of the Hungarians.

According to Constantine VII Porphyrogenitus' De administrando imperio, because of the alliance and the courage shown by the Hungarian people in all the wars they fought with the Khazars, Levedi, the first voivode of the Hungarians, who was also famous for his valor, was given a Khazar princess in marriage "so that she might have children by him". However, as it turned out, Levedi did not produce offspring with this lady.

Later, after the Khazars defeated the Perchengs and forced them to resettle in the land of the Hungarians, whom they defeated and split in two, the Khazars picked Levedi, the "first among the Hungarians" and sought to make him the prince of the Hungarian tribes so that he "may be obedient to the [Khazars'] word and [their] command". Thus, according to Constantine, the Khazar khagan initiated the centralization of the command of the Hungarian tribes in order to strengthen his own suzerainty over them. Levedi, however, refused, because he wasn't "strong enough for this rule". Instead, Constantine claims, Levedi proposed another Hungarian voivode, Álmos or his son Árpád as prince of the Hungarians.

The Magyar settlement between the Volga river and the Urals the mountains were named Lebedia, soon to become Levedia, after Levedi.

Name and title 

The only source of Levedi's life is the De administrando imperio, a book written by the Byzantine Emperor Constantine Porphyrogenitus around 950. According to one theory, the name is derived from the common Slavic word "Lebedi", swan. According to historian Omeljan Pritsak, Levedi's name―which was actually a title―derived from the Turkic expression "alp edi", or "brave lord". The Hungarian historian Gyula Kristó, who refuses Pritsak's theory, says that Levedi's name is connected to the Hungarian verb "lesz" ("be"). Other scholars agree that the origin of the name is probably Finno-Ugric. It derives from "the participle of the old lesz ('will be') verb lës (meaning levő - 'being') with the diminutive suffix -di." A similar proper name (Lewedi) was recorded in a Hungarian charter, issued in 1138.

It has also been put forward that the land, Lebedi, did not derive its name from the chieftain, but the other way around. Thus, the voivode had gotten his name from the land. However, Kristó says that this would be in contrast with the source and the Hungarian practice of giving names.

In De administrando imperio 
In the De administrando imperio Levedi is said to be one of the voivode of one of the seven clans of Hungarians, who lived together with the Khazars for a period of time. They are said to have fought in alliance with the Khazars in all their wars. Then, because of the courage of the Hungarians and their alliance, the chagan-prince (Khazar khan) gave a noble Khazar lady (i.e. not a member of the Khan's family) in marriage to their first voivode Levedi. The Hungarians, who had lived together with the Khazars, as a separate entity, and fought valiantly with them, had shown the Khagan their people's illustriousness and courage, and he gave the first among them a princess to marry. However, Levedi had no children by her. The Percheng, said by Constantine to have been previously called Kangar (Κάγγαρ), after being defeated and displaced by the Khazars into the Hungarians' land, waged war against the Hungarians and, Constantine continues, the Hungarians were defeated and forced to leave their homeland (in fact, it was the Magyars' intervention in a conflict between the First Bulgarian Empire and the Byzantine Empire that caused a joint counter-invasion by the Bulgars and Pechenegs). He then says that the Hungarians (who Constantine erroneously calls Turks throughout) split into two parts: one went to Persia (Περσία) and the other, together with their chieftain Levedi, settled westward. The Khazar khan sent a message to the Hungarians. He required that Levedi be sent to him. Levedi accepted and went to the khan. He asked the chagan why he sent for him, and the latter replied: "We have invited you upon this account, in order that, since you are noble and wise and valorous and first among the [Hungarians], we may appoint you prince of your nation, and you may be obedient to our word and our command." But he, in reply, answered the chagan: "Your regard and purpose for me I highly esteem and express to you suitable thanks, but since I am not strong enough for this rule, I cannot obey you; on the other hand, however, there is a voivode other than me, called [Álmos], and he has a son called [Árpád]; let one of these, rather, either that [Álmos] or his son [Árpád], be made prince, and be obedient to your word." The chagan was satisfied by the proposal, and sent him back with some of his men. After discussing the matter with his people, they together chose Árpád as their prince. They chose him because he was of superior parts, and greatly admired for his wisdom. They raised him on a shield and made him their prince. Years later, the Perchenegs fell on the Hungarians, and drove them out with their prince Árpád. In turn, the Hungarians drove out the inhabitants of great Moravia and settled in their land. Up to the time when Constantine is writing, he says, they weren't attacked again by their enemies the Perchenegs anymore.

Constantine notes that the Hungarians raised Árpád on the shield in the manner of the Khazars. Indeed, the historical social structure of the Hungarians was of Turkic origin. The Hungarian language is abundant in words of Turkic origin, and the Hungarians do have some Turkic genetic and cultural influence. However, they are not a Turkic people. On the other hand, as expressed by Constantine, they lived among the Khazars, fighting in all their wars, and the first among them, Levedi, was given a Khazar princess in marriage.

Levedi bore the title "voivode", which is of Slavic origin. When using that title, Porphyrogenitus always referred to the heads of the seven Hungarian tribes. Historian Dezső Paizs says that Levedi was the head of specifically the Megyer tribe (one of the seven ancestral Hungarian tribes), but his theory has not been widely accepted.

References

Notes

Sources

Primary sources 

 Constantine Porphyrogenitus: De Administrando Imperio (Greek text edited by Gyula Moravcsik, English translation by Romillyi J. H. Jenkins) (1967). Dumbarton Oaks Center for Byzantine Studies. .

Secondary sources 

 
 
 
 
 
 

Khazars
History of the Hungarians
Hungarian prehistory
9th-century Hungarian people
9th-century rulers in Europe
Magyar tribal chieftains
Hungarian monarchs